The 2011 European Track Championships were the European Championships for track cycling. The junior and under 23 riders events took place at the Velódromo Nacional de Sangalhos in Anadia, Portugal from 26 to 31 July 2011.

Medal summary

Under 23

Junior

Medal table

References

External links

European Track Championships, 2011
under-23
European Track Championships, 2011